The Pajieslys Geomorphological Sanctuary is a protected area of a state importance in Krakės Eldership, Kėdainiai District Municipality, in central Lithuania. It is located west to Pajieslys village, between Deveikiškiai and Meironiškiai.

The sanctuary was created to protect a peripheral moraine ridge fragment, which is not covered by forests.

References

Protected areas in Kėdainiai District Municipality
1992 establishments in Lithuania